Ten athletes (eight men and two women) from Yugoslavia competed at the 1996 Summer Paralympics in Atlanta, United States.

Medalists

See also
Yugoslavia at the Paralympics
Yugoslavia at the 1996 Summer Olympics

References 

Nations at the 1996 Summer Paralympics
1996
Summer Paralympics